Associação Brasileira de Estatística (ABE) is a non-profit organization with the purpose of promoting the development and application of statistical science. It also acts as a debating place for any professional body that has an interest in statistics.

ABE organizes the Simpósio Nacional de Probabilidade e Estatística (SINAPE), a symposium where statisticians from all over the country can debate the latest advances in probability theory and statistics.

ABE publishes the Brazilian Journal of Probability and Statistics. The journal is published four times per year.

See also 
 List of presidents of the Associação Brasileira de Estatística

External links 
 ABE's Website

Statistical societies
Professional associations based in Brazil